Gheorghe Chiper (born 8 April 1978) is a Romanian former competitive figure skater. He is an eight-time Romanian national champion and competed at two Olympic Games. He is the first Romanian skater to win a medal on the Grand Prix circuit and the first Romanian to land a quadruple toe loop in competition.

Career 
Chiper competed at three World Junior Championships; his best result was 15th in 1997.

Chiper made his senior World Championships debut in 1998, finishing 16th in the qualifying round. The following season, Chiper won his first senior national title.

In the 2000–01 season, he was coached by Sylvia Holtes in Groningen, Netherlands. In 2001–02, Sandra Schär became his coach in Küsnacht, Switzerland. Chiper competed at his first Olympics in 2002, placing 23rd.

At the 2005 European Championships, Chiper achieved his best European result, 8th.

In winning bronze at the 2005 Trophee Eric Bompard, Chiper became the first Romanian to ever medal on the Grand Prix series. He placed 14th at his second Olympics in Torino, Italy. He competed for the final time at the 2006 World Championships where he also placed 14th, his career-best Worlds result. 

Since his competitive retirement, he has worked as a coach in Switzerland.

Personal life 
Chiper was born on 8 April 1978 in Miercurea Ciuc, Romania. He speaks Romanian, Hungarian, English, and German. He is of part-Hungarian descent. In 2000, he married Sandra Schär, with whom he has a daughter, Flora, born in May 2000 and a son, Aurel.

Programs

Results
GP: Grand Prix

References

External links 
 Skate Academy
 Official site
 

1978 births
Sportspeople from Miercurea Ciuc
Romanian male single skaters
Olympic figure skaters of Romania
Figure skaters at the 2006 Winter Olympics
Figure skaters at the 2002 Winter Olympics
Living people
Competitors at the 1997 Winter Universiade